The Rural Municipality of Dufferin No. 190 is a rural municipality (RM) in the Canadian province of Saskatchewan within Census Division No. 6 and  Division No. 2. It is located in the south-central portion of the province.

History 
The RM of Dufferin No. 190 incorporated as a rural municipality on December 9, 1912.

Geography

Communities and localities 
The following urban municipalities are surrounded by the RM.

Villages
Bethune
Findlater

The following unincorporated communities are within the RM.

Localities
North Grove

Demographics 

Government 
The RM of Dufferin No. 190 is governed by an elected municipal council and an appointed administrator that meets on the second Wednesday of every month. The reeve of the RM is Russ Kirzinger while its administrator is Rodney Audette. The RM's office is located in Bethune.

References 

D

Division No. 6, Saskatchewan